Callidium rufipenne is a species of beetle in the family Cerambycidae. It was described by Victor Motschulsky in 1860.

References

Callidium
Beetles described in 1860